Epargyreus zestos, known generally as the zestos skipper or rusty skipper, is a species of dicot skipper in the family Hesperiidae.  It is found in the Caribbean and North America.

A subspecies of Epargyreus zestos is E. zestos inaguarum.

References

Further reading

 
 
 

Eudaminae